Stefania Farrugia (born 11 September 1991) is a Maltese footballer who plays as a defender and has appeared for the Malta women's national team.

Career
Farrugia has been capped for the Malta national team, appearing for the team during the 2019 FIFA Women's World Cup qualifying cycle.

International goals

References

External links
 
 
 

1991 births
Living people
Maltese women's footballers
Malta women's international footballers
Women's association football defenders